Oma is a settlement in Zapolyarny District, Nenets Autonomous Okrug, Russia. It had a population of 763 in 2010, a decrease from its population of 795 in 2002.

Geography

Oma is located about 305 km southwest of Naryan-Mar, on the eponymous River Oma.

Transport

From Oma, there is a flight to Naryan-Mar.

Climate

Oma has a subarctic climate (Dfc).

References 

Rural localities in Nenets Autonomous Okrug